Wilfrid Francis Reay (12 June 1891 − 8 October 1915) was an English first-class cricketer and British Army officer.

The son of J. H. Reay, a civil servant, he was born at Wallington in June 1891. He worked in the London Stock Exchange as an authorised clerk, and was married to Dorothy Katherine Livermore. He made a single appearance in first-class cricket for the Gentlemen of England against Oxford University at Eastbourne in June 1910. Batting once in the match, he scored 5 not out in the Gentlemen of England first-innings, while with the ball he took a single wicket in the Oxford first-innings when he dismissed Charles Hooman, finishing with figures of 1 for 51 from eleven overs. He served in the First World War with the Royal Fusiliers as part of The Stockbrokers' Battalion, enlisting in August 1914 as a lance corporal. He landed in Boulogne in on 30 July 1915, with his battalion sent to Tilques. He was killed in action nearby on 8 October 1915. His body was never recovered and he is commemorated at the Thiepval Memorial. His brother, Gilly, was also a first-class cricketer.

References

External links

1891 births
1915 deaths
Military personnel from Surrey
Missing in action of World War I
People from Wallington, London
English cricketers
Gentlemen of England cricketers
British Army personnel of World War I
Royal Fusiliers soldiers
British military personnel killed in World War I